Steir is a surname. People with that name include:

 Mitchell S. Steir (born 1955), American real estate broker
 Pat Steir (born 1940), American painter and printmaker
 Philip Steir (active from 1988), American musician, remixer, composer and music producer

See also
 Steyr (disambiguation)